Innamoramento is the fifth studio album by Mylène Farmer, released on 7 April 1999. With sales of 1.5 million, the album is one the singer's most successful ones. It reached Diamond status in France and landed Farmer a number of awards, including Album of the Year at the 1st NRJ Music Awards. On the heels of the album's success, Farmer was also named Best Female French-language Artist in two consecutive years: 2000 and 2001.

Background and release
By 1999, Farmer had barely appeared in the media since her 1996 concerts at Paris-Bercy. The singer spent most of this time traveling many countries (such as China, Ireland, Italy and the United States), where she drew her inspiration for her next album, giving it a greater ethnic orientation. She was also inspired by the books Falling In Love by Francesco Alberoni, If This Is a Man by Primo Levi, and books on Buddhism. While some media announced that the album would be called Immortelles, Mes Moires (according to the magazine Voici), Mémoires and Ensemble, rumor had it that the next album would have more techno sound (and the first single would be named "The Small World", according to the Belgian newspaper 7 Extra). It was recorded at studios Ocean Way Recording and Record One in Los Angeles, but mixed at Guillaume Tell studio in Paris.

Finally, the album was released on 7 April, almost a month after the lead single "L'Âme-stram-gram" and was named Innamoramento, in reference to the book by Francesco Alberoni mentioned above. A quote from the author is also cited on the first page of the album's booklet. The photographs, produced by Marino Parisotto Vay, cost about 104,000 euros. The cover shows Farmer dressed in white on top of an open iron cage in the middle of the ocean.

Lyrics and music
All lyrics were written by Farmer, who also composed the music for five songs. They contain many references to literary writers and painters. The album deals with Farmer's anxieties, such as pain, unhappy love, sexuality and the passage of the time. But as the title suggests, love is the central theme of the album.

The album is slower in comparison to Farmer's previous studio album, the rock-inspired Anamorphosée (1995). The sound is more electronic and intimate.

Critical reception

The album received mostly positive reviews from media. DH Magazine stated that this album doesn't contain "any surprise, but is "tidy, less sophisticated than Anamorphosée, and ultimately captivating. (...) It is more spiritual". L'Humanité stated in their review "Her songs resemble the prayers of a monk, whose writing has always been seen as a therapy".

However, certain reviews were less positive. For example, one magazine declared that "the musical climates remain the same, with arrangements with big spectacle and an evident dance efficiency", but with "too many strings, (...) too many background vocals, no place to breathe". Another magazine said that, in spite of the sophistication of the lyrics which is equal to the lace of the arrangements of melodies, songs are however rather insignificant. The album is considered "identical" to the previous ones by another press article.  It was finally trashed as a "Destroy" by Claude Rajotte of Canada's Musique Plus defunct show Le cimetière des CD, the same critic who had praised Farmer's previous effort, Anamorphosée.

In 2000, Innamoramento won a NRJ Music Awards in the category 'Francophone album of the year'.

Commercial performance
In France, the album was released at a time when Francis Cabrel also made his comeback with his album Hors Saison, which topped the French Albums Chart. As a result, Innamoramento failed to reach #1 on the chart, but went straight in at #2 on 10 April 1999, remaining there for two weeks. Despite not hitting the top spot, the album remained in the chart for 94 weeks, including 18 weeks in the top ten and became one of Farmer's highest selling albums. It re-entered the chart during Farmer's Mylenium Tour and also when Universal organised further promotion of the album. Certified Diamond disc by the SNEP, Innamoramento ranked #4, #43 and #92 on 1999, 2000 and 2001 End of Year Charts respectively.

In Belgium (Wallonia), after entering at #5 on 17 April 1999, the album climbed to #2 during the following week and stayed there for five consecutive weeks. As in France, Francis Cabrel's album prevented Innamoramento from reaching the top of the chart. The album remained for 27 weeks in the top ten and 66 weeks in the Top 50. It featured at #5 and #58 on the 1999 and 2000 End of Year Charts.

Innamoramento also appeared for two weeks on the Belgium (Flanders) Albums Chart, on which it peaked at # 40.

Track listing

Personnel 

 Angeline Annonier – choeurs
 Fred Attal – arranger, clavier, producer, programming, sauf
 Pascaud Caroline Blandin – background vocals
 Bertrand Chatnet – engineer, mixing
 Jeff Dahlgren – guitar
 Pol Ramirez del Piu – bagpipes, cymbalom, flute
 Jerome Devoise – assistant
 Mylène Farmer – vocals
 Johanna Ferdinand – choeurs, background vocals
 Denny Fongheiser – drums
 Joelle Jaque-Gustave – Choeurs
 Abe Laboriel, Jr. - drums
 Abraham Laboriel, Sr. - bass
 Sophia Nelson – choeurs, background vocals
 Rik Pekkonen – engineer
 Colonna Phillippe – engineer
 Marie-jo plezel – Choeurs
 Mathieu Rabaté – drums
 Carole Rowley – background vocals
 Rafa Sardina – assistant
 Mike Scotella – assistant
 Billy Sheehan – bass
 Frank Simes – guitar
 John Sorenson – assistant
 Chris Spedding – guitar
 Jerry Watts, Jr. - bass

Charts

Weekly charts

Year-end charts

Certifications and sales

Formats
 CD - Jewel case
 CD - Cardboard gatefold sleeve - Limited edition (300,000)
 Collector edition box - Numbered travel log version (including a CD and a booklet of travel with unpublished photos)
 Cassette
 Double 12"
 CD - Japan
 CD - Digipak (since 2005)

References

1999 albums
Mylène Farmer albums
Polydor Records albums